Jonathan C. Collins House and Cemetery is a historic home located at Constableville in Lewis County, New York. It was built between 1797 and 1802 and is a -story, five bays wide and two bays long, center entry frame dwelling with a large rear wing.  It rests on a stone foundation and has a gable roof.  Located opposite is the Collins family cemetery with the earliest burial dated 1793 and the last in 1943.  It contains several fine examples of funerary design executed in local stone.

It was listed on the National Register of Historic Places in 1988.

References

External links
 

Houses on the National Register of Historic Places in New York (state)
Cemeteries on the National Register of Historic Places in New York (state)
Federal architecture in New York (state)
Houses completed in 1802
Houses in Lewis County, New York
Cemeteries in Lewis County, New York
National Register of Historic Places in Lewis County, New York